The Bruce Peninsula Multisport Race is a multisport race with no navigational component, held on the Bruce Peninsula since 2011:. Racers follow a marked course on a combination of private and public land and race in multiple stages of paddling, mountain biking and trail running. There is also a sprint distance which is typically  in length, as well as a children's race that takes place concurrent with the full distance. The event takes place annually on the second weekend in August and is based out of Wiarton, in Ontario, Canada.

The race is a qualifying stop on Adventure Racing Ontario's points series, which is a schedule of team-based adventure sport events taking place in the province of Ontario.

The 2020 race was canceled by organizers due to the COVID-19 pandemic with registrants given their choice of a credit for a future event or a partial refund. The race was also featured on the final episode of season 3 of the TV show Boundless.

Past Subaru Long Course Winners (full distance)

Past Suntrail Course Winners (sprint distance paddle-bike-run)

*abandoned due to extreme weather

Past Paddle-Duathlon Winners (sprint distance paddle-bike-paddle)

Past Run-Duathlon Winners (sprint distance run-bike-run)

The fastest completion of the sprint distance (solo or team) is 1h 28min 2sec recorded by Steven Nadjiwon in 2015 and the fastest completion of the full distance (solo or team) is 5h 45min 12sec recorded in 2012 by Bob Miller, known from Team Canada Adventure on World's Toughest Race's Team Canada Adventure.

References 

Multisports in Canada
Racing